Ivaylo or Ivailo is a masculine name of Bulgarian origin, often given in reference to the medieval leader Ivaylo of Bulgaria. The name is likely derived from the Bulgarian name Vulo, meaning "wolf." Ivaylo may refer to:
Ivaylo Kirov
Ivaylo Petkov
Ivaylo Rusev
Ivaylo Zafirov
Ivaylo Todorov
Ivaylo Haralampiev
Ivaylo Loubomerov

Notes

Masculine given names
Bulgarian masculine given names